Slumberland may relate to:
 Slumberland Furniture, a furniture retailer in the midwestern United States
 Slumberland Records, originally a Washington, D.C. area, now Oakland CA-based independent indiepop label,
 Little Nemo in Slumberland, a comic strip featuring the character Little Nemo
 Little Nemo: Adventures in Slumberland, a 1989 animated film adaptation of the comic strip
 Slumberland (film), a 2022 film adaptation of the comic strip
 Slumberland Ltd, a UK bed manufacturer, now a subsidiary of Investcorp
 Slumberland, an album by American Idol winner Lee DeWyze
 Slumberland, a novel by Paul Beatty